For over a century, the city of San Francisco, California, allowed unrestricted public nudity. In 2012, the city changed the law to require a parade permit for certain displays of public nudity.

In 1967, San Gregorio Beach, 20 miles south of San Francisco, became the first official nude beach in America. The San Francisco Bay Guardian published a guide to California clothing-optional beaches annually. Several beaches in San Francisco are clothing-optional.

The California Supreme Court, in In Re Smith (1972), held that sunbathing on an isolated beach was not lewd. 

There is a rarely enforced anti-nudity civil ordinance in the parks of San Francisco, including Golden Gate Park. This ordinance was put in place in 1970 in response to hippies dancing nude in a circle every Sunday in Speedway Meadow in Golden Gate Park.

In 1969, Carol Doda began go-go dancing bottomless at the Condor Club on Broadway and Columbus in North Beach (she had been dancing topless at the Condor since 1964).  Soon nude dancers began dancing at various clubs in North Beach. Three gay bars featured nude go-go dancing between 1969 and 1972. However, because of complaints, in the summer of 1972, California banned nudity in places that serve alcohol.

In September 2011, San Francisco city supervisor Scott Wiener introduced an ordinance to put restrictions on certain public nudity in San Francisco in response to complaints about a group of nudists who regularly gathered at an outdoor plaza in the Castro, which caused protests by nudists. A suit to block the ordinance was rejected by a federal judge. On November 20, 2012, the city's Board of Supervisors passed an ordinance banning public nudity in San Francisco without a parade permit and the nudity ban went into effect on February 1, 2013.

Female toplessness was not affected by the ordinance and is allowed throughout the city. Since the 2012 ordinance was passed, nudist events are still held in the city with a permit.

See also

References

Culture of San Francisco
Naturism in the United States